Timur Magomedovich Zangiyev (born 7 September 1972) is a Russian professional football manager and a former player.

External links
 

1972 births
Living people
Russian footballers
Association football midfielders
Russian football managers
FC Angusht Nazran players